The Nigerian government has commissioned the overseas production and launch of four satellites.

Satellites

Nigeriasat-1 
The Nigeriasat-1 was the first satellite to be built under the Nigerian government sponsorship. The satellite was launched from Russia on 27 September 2003. Nigeriasat-1 was part of the worldwide Disaster Monitoring Constellation System.

The primary objectives of the Nigeriasat-1 were: to give early warning signals of environmental disaster; to help detect and control desertification in the northern part of Nigeria; to assist in demographic planning; to establish the relationship between malaria vectors and the environment that breeds malaria and to give early warning signals on future outbreaks of meningitis using remote sensing technology; to provide the technology needed to bring education to all parts of the country through distant learning; and to aid in conflict resolution and border disputes by mapping out state and International borders.

NigeriaSat-2 
NigeriaSat-2, Nigeria's second satellite, was built as a high-resolution earth satellite by Surrey Space Technology Limited, a United Kingdom-based satellite technology company. It has 2.5-metre resolution panchromatic (very high resolution), 5-metre multispectral (high resolution, NIR red, green and red bands), and 32-metre multispectral (medium resolution, NIR red, green and red bands) antennas, with a ground receiving station in Abuja.

.

NigComSat-1 

NigComSat-1, a Nigerian satellite built in 2004, was Nigeria's third satellite and Africa's first communication satellite. It was launched on 13 May 2007, aboard a Chinese Long March 3B carrier rocket, from the Xichang Satellite Launch Centre in China. The spacecraft was operated by NigComSat and the Nigerian Space Agency, NASRDA. On 11 November 2008, NigComSat-1 failed in orbit after running out of power due to an anomaly in its solar array. It was based on the Chinese DFH-4 satellite bus, and carries a variety of transponders: 4 C band; 14 ; 8 ; and 2 L band. It was designed to provide coverage to many parts of Africa, and the Ka-band transponders would also cover Italy.

On 10 November 2008 (0900 GMT), the satellite was reportedly switched off for analysis and to avoid a possible collision with other satellites. According to Nigerian Communications Satellite Limited, it was put into "emergency mode operation in order to effect mitigation and repairs". The satellite eventually failed after losing power on 11 November 2008.

NigComSat-1R 
On 24 March 2009, the Nigerian Federal Ministry of Science and Technology, NigComSat Ltd. and CGWIC signed another contract for the in-orbit delivery of the NigComSat-1R satellite. NigComSat-1R was also a DFH-4 satellite, and the replacement for the failed NigComSat-1 was successfully launched  into orbit by China in Xichang on December 19, 2011. The satellite according to Nigerian President Goodluck Jonathan which was paid for by the insurance policy on NigComSat-1 which de-orbited in 2009, would have a positive impact on national development in various sectors such as communications, internet services, health, agriculture, environmental protection and national security. It was launched in the year 2009.

See also 
 Telecommunications in Nigeria
 List of Earth observation satellites

References 

Weather satellites
Geography of Nigeria
Communications in Nigeria